Steve Atkins is a former running back in the National Football League.

Early life
Atkins was born Steven Elwood Atkins on June 22, 1956, in Spotsylvania County, Virginia.

Football career
Atkins played at the collegiate level at the University of Maryland, College Park.

He was drafted by the Green Bay Packers in the second round of the 1979 NFL Draft and played two seasons for the team before splitting the 1981 season with the Packers and the Philadelphia Eagles.

See also
List of Green Bay Packers players
List of Philadelphia Eagles players

References

1956 births
People from Spotsylvania County, Virginia
Green Bay Packers players
Philadelphia Eagles players
American football running backs
Maryland Terrapins football players
Living people